Kuřimany is a municipality and village in Strakonice District in the South Bohemian Region of the Czech Republic. It has about 50 inhabitants.

Geography
It lies in the Bohemian Forest Foothills.

History
The first written mention of Kuřimany is from 1327.

Sights

The main landmark of Kuřimany is the Chapel of Saint John of Nepomuk with a baroque gable and bell tower.

References

External links

Villages in Strakonice District